Crow Run is a stream in the U.S. state of West Virginia.

Crow Run was named after J. J. Crow, a pioneer hunter who was killed by Indians.

See also
List of rivers of West Virginia

References

Rivers of Wetzel County, West Virginia
Rivers of West Virginia